Viljandi JK Tulevik, commonly known as Viljandi Tulevik, or simply as Tulevik, is a football club based in Viljandi, Estonia, that competes in the Esiliiga B, the third tier of Estonian football. The club's home ground is Viljandi linnastaadion.

Founded in 1912 as Sports Association Tulevik (Future), the club was disbanded in 1940 and re-established in 1992 as one of the founding members of the Meistriliiga.

History

Early history 
Founded in 1912 as Sports Association Tulevik (Future), in part, by Heinrich Aviksoo, they began playing football in 1913 on a field by Lake Viljandi, where Viljandi linnastaadion was built in 1928. Interrupted by World War I and the Estonian War of Independence, Tulevik didn't resume playing football until 1927. In 1937, they won the Central division of the regional B klass. Following the Soviet occupation of Estonia in 1940, Tulevik was disbanded.

In 1977, Viljandi Linnameeskond was formed. The team was promoted to the Soviet Estonian Championship in 1981 and spent the next decade within the top two tiers of Estonian football.

Tulevik's revival 
In 1992, after Estonia had regained its independence, Viljandi Linnameeskond was first renamed JK Viljandi, and then JK Tulevik, and became a founding member of the Meistriliiga. After two seasons, the club was relegated to the Esiliiga. In 1997, Tulevik became a part of the Flora system and returned to the Meistriliiga, while Sergei Ratnikov was appointed as manager. In June 1998, Ratnikov was replaced by Tarmo Rüütli.

The club made their European debut in the 1998 UEFA Intertoto Cup, losing to St. Gallen 3–9 on aggregate in the first round. Under Rüütli, Tulevik reached the 1998–99 Estonian Cup final, losing to Levadia 2–3, and finished the 1999 Meistriliiga season as runners-up. Tulevik faced Club Brugge in the 1999/00 UEFA qualifying rounds, but lost 0–5 on aggregate. In November 1999, Rüütli left the club to manage Flora and the Estonia national team, and was replaced by his assistant Aivar Lillevere. Tulevik reached the Estonian Cup final again in the following season, but were defeated by Levadia again 0–2.

In 2011, Tulevik ended their affiliation with Flora. As a result, the newly formed FC Viljandi took their place in the Meistriliiga and Tulevik were relegated to the II liiga. In January 2013, Aivar Lillevere returned to the club as manager. Tulevik finished the 2014 Esiliiga in fifth place and defeated Lokomotiv 1–1 on aggregate on away goal in the promotion play-offs, thus earning promotion to the Meistriliiga. The team's stay in the top division proved short-lived as the club finished the 2015 season in last place and were relegated. Tulevik won the 2016 Esiliiga and were once again promoted to the Meistriliiga. Lillevere resigned in November 2017 and was replaced by Marko Kristal in the following month. In April 2018, Kristal's contract was terminated after disappointing results in the league, with Sander Post taking over as manager.

Under Sander Post, Tulevik established themselves in the Meistriliiga, finishing the 2018 season and 2019 season in 7th place and 2020 season in 6th place. In November 2020, Sander Post announced that he would be stepping down as manager and continue as the sporting director of Tulevik. Jaanus Reitel was announced as his replacement as manager. Viljandi Tulevik finished the 2021 season in 8th place. On 8 December 2021, Tulevik announced they will leave top-flight football due to financial reasons, with club president Raiko Mutle saying the Covid pandemic had made the club's economic situation extraordinarily difficult and Tulevik would now take the time to focus on improving their sustainability and youth system.

In the following 2022 season, Viljandi Tulevik entered Esiliiga, the second of tier of Estonian football. With the team consisting mostly of club's youth players, Tulevik finished the season in 9th place.

Stadium

Tulevik initially played on a field by Lake Viljandi. In 1928, a stadium was built on the same site. Renovated in 2010, Viljandi linnastaadion (Viljandi City Stadium) is a multi-purpose stadium with a capacity of 1,068. The stadium is located at Ranna 1, Viljandi.

In autumn 2021, a state-of-the-art indoor football facility was opened in Viljandi. Costing nearly 3 million euros, the sports complex facilitates footballers during the snowy winter and spring months.

Players

Current squad

Out on loan

Reserves and academy

Club officials

Coaching staff

Managerial history

Honours

League
 Meistriliiga
 Runners-up (1): 1999
 Esiliiga
 Winners (1): 2016
 B klass (Central Division)
 Winners (1): 1937

Cups
 Estonian Cup
 Runners-up (2): 1998–99, 1999–2000
 Estonian Supercup
 Runners-up (1): 2000

Seasons and statistics

Seasons

Europe

References

External links

  
 Viljandi JK Tulevik at Estonian Football Association
 Viljandi JK Tulevik at UEFA.com

 
1912 establishments in Estonia
Association football clubs established in 1912
Football clubs in Estonia
Meistriliiga clubs
Sport in Viljandi